Wolf Tracks may refer to:

 Wolf Tracks (1920 film), a 1920 American short Western film starring Hoot Gibson
 Wolf Tracks (1923 film), an American silent western film starring Jack Hoxie
 Wolf Tracks – Best of Los Lobos, an album by Los Lobos released 2006
 Wolftracks, a 1982 album by John Kay & Steppenwolf
 Wolf Tracks, a 2002 composition by Jean-Pascal Beintus, released on the 2003 album Wolf Tracks and Peter and the Wolf